Ricardo Thalheimer (born 29 December 1992) is a Brazilian footballer who plays as a central defender.

Club career
Born in Santo Augusto, Rio Grande do Sul, Ricardo finished his formation with União Frederiquense in 2012, being promoted to the first team on 26 November of that year. After representing lowly locals Três Passos, EC Palmeirense, Santo Ângelo and Tupy, he joined São Luiz for the 2017 season.

On 11 August 2017, after winning the year's Campeonato Gaúcho Série A2, Ricardo renewed his contract with São Luiz. In April of the following year, he moved to Novo Hamburgo for the 2018 Campeonato Brasileiro Série D, but agreed to return to his previous club in August.

On 21 February 2019, Ricardo was presented at Série A side Avaí. He made his top tier debut on 12 May, starting in a 0–0 home draw against CSA.

Honours
São Luiz
Campeonato Gaúcho Série A2: 2017

Avaí
Campeonato Catarinense: 2019

References

External links
 

1992 births
Living people
Sportspeople from Rio Grande do Sul
Brazilian footballers
Association football defenders
Campeonato Brasileiro Série A players
Campeonato Brasileiro Série D players
Associação Esportiva e Recreativa Santo Ângelo players
Esporte Clube São Luiz players
Esporte Clube Novo Hamburgo players
Avaí FC players